The Old Swimmin' Hole is a 1921 American silent comedy film directed by Joe De Grasse based on the poem The Old Swimmin' Hole by James Whitcomb Riley. A reviewer for Exhibitors Herald summarized, "The theme of the picture is a light one—just the pleasant little love story of a country schoolboy and girl in the era of the youth of Tom Sawyer."

The film's lack of intertitles has been described as innovative. "This marks an advance in film making," the same reviewer claimed. "Their absence is not realized for some time after the feature has proceeded, a certain indication that it has been skillfully welded together without them and their place supplied by good acting."

Cast
Charles Ray as Ezra Hull
Laura La Plante as Myrtle
James Gordon as Mr. Hull
Blanche Rose as Mrs. Hull
Marjorie Prevost as Esther
Lincoln Stedman as Skinny
Lon Poff as Professor Payne

References

External links

1921 films
American silent feature films
American black-and-white films
1921 comedy films
Films based on poems
Films directed by Joseph De Grasse
First National Pictures films
Films based on works by James Whitcomb Riley
Silent American comedy films
1920s American films